The Ordovician meteor event was a dramatic increase in the rate at which L chondrite meteorites fell to Earth during the Middle Ordovician period, about 467.5±0.28 million years ago. This is indicated by abundant fossil L chondrite meteorites in a quarry in Sweden and enhanced concentrations of ordinary chondritic chromite grains in sedimentary rocks from this time. This temporary increase in the impact rate was most likely caused by the destruction of the L chondrite parent body 468 ± 0.3 million years ago having scattered fragments into Earth-crossing orbits, a chronology which is also supported by shock ages in numerous L chondrite meteorites that fall to Earth today. It has been speculated that this influx contributed to, or possibly even instigated, the Great Ordovician Biodiversification Event, although this has been questioned.

Possible craters

See also 

 Österplana 065
 Late Ordovician impact craters
 Lockne crater
 Målingen crater
 Pilot crater
 Tvären

References 

 
Meteor
Meteor
Meteor
Meteor
Meteor
Meteor
Impact craters of Canada
Impact craters of Sweden
Impact craters of the United States